Lesticus peguensis is a species of ground beetle in the subfamily Pterostichinae. It was described by Henry Walter Bates in 1892.

References

Lesticus
Beetles described in 1892